Egidijus Majus (born 5 January 1984) is a Lithuanian footballer currently playing for Dinamo Samarqand. His former club were DAC Dunajská Streda and Steel Azin.

He played 1 game for Zenit St. Petersburg main squad in the Russian Cup.

External links
 

1984 births
Living people
Lithuanian footballers
Lithuanian expatriate footballers
Lithuania international footballers
FK Ekranas players
FK Vėtra players
FC Zenit Saint Petersburg players
Russian Premier League players
Expatriate footballers in Russia
FC DAC 1904 Dunajská Streda players
Slovak Super Liga players
Expatriate footballers in Slovakia
Lithuanian expatriate sportspeople in Slovakia
Steel Azin F.C. players
Expatriate footballers in Iran
Lithuanian expatriate sportspeople in Iran
FK Dinamo Samarqand players
Association football defenders
Expatriate footballers in Uzbekistan
Lithuanian expatriate sportspeople in Uzbekistan